The Karađorđevo estate lies 10 km north-west of Bačka Palanka, Serbia. The property is state-owned, and managed by an establishment of the Army of Serbia. Since its establishment as a state property of the Austro-Hungarian Empire in 1885, it has served as a representative hunting ground and resort for statesmen, high-ranking military officials and businessmen.

The landscape features centuries-old oak and acacia woods, marshes, variety of flora and fauna species and a long distance from the nearest settlements. It is open to hunters and tourists throughout the year.

The property is also famous for its elite stud farm, with a museum of horse racing. The farm was originally created in 1904, using horses from the famous Hungarian State Stud of Mezőhegyes.

In 1971, Josip Broz Tito convened a joint meeting of the leaders of the League of Communists of Yugoslavia and the League of Communists of Croatia at the Karađorđevo estate which resulted in a suppression of the Croatian Spring.

The resort gained notoriety when the Milošević–Tuđman Karađorđevo meeting was held there by presidents of Serbia Slobodan Milošević and Croatia Franjo Tuđman on the eve of the Yugoslav Wars, where they purportedly made a secret deal about partition of Yugoslavia.

References

Bačka Palanka
Protected areas of Serbia
Nature reserves in Serbia